Eleutherodactylus cuneatus is a species of frog in the family Eleutherodactylidae endemic to Cuba. Its natural habitats are subtropical or tropical moist lowland forest, subtropical or tropical moist montane forest, subtropical or tropical moist shrubland, subtropical or tropical seasonally wet or flooded lowland grassland, rivers, arable land, pastureland, plantations, rural gardens, urban areas, heavily degraded former forest, and seasonally flooded agricultural land.

References

cuneatus
Endemic fauna of Cuba
Amphibians of Cuba
Amphibians described in 1862
Taxonomy articles created by Polbot